Purunllacta or Purum Llacta (Quechua purum, purun savage, wild / wasteland, llaqta place (village, town, city, country, nation)  is an archaeological site of the Chachapoya culture in Peru. It is situated in the Amazonas Region, Chachapoyas Province, Cheto District, on the mountain of the same name. It lies northeast and near the archaeological site of Purunllacta of the Soloco District.

The site was declared a National Cultural Heritage by Resolución Directoral Nacional No. 196-INC on April 2, 2003.

See also 
 Machu Pirqa
 Quchapampa

References 

Archaeological sites in Peru
Archaeological sites in Amazonas Region
Mountains of Amazonas Region